Where the Happy People Go is the third studio album by American soul-disco group, The Trammps, released in 1976 through Atlantic Records.

Commercial performance
The album peaked at No. 13 on the R&B albums chart. It also reached No. 50 on the Billboard 200. The album features the singles "That's Where the Happy People Go", which peaked at No. 12 on the Hot Soul Singles chart, No. 27 on the Billboard Hot 100, and No. 1 on the Hot Dance Club Play chart, and "Disco Party", which charted at No. 1 on the Hot Dance Club Play chart.

Track listing

Personnel
The Trammps
Jimmy Ellis – lead vocal
Stanley Wade – vocal, bass
Harold Wade – vocal
Earl Young – vocal, drums
Robert Upchurch – vocal

Additional Personnel
Bobby Eli, Norman Harris – guitar
Ron "Have Mercy" Kersey – keyboards
Bruce Gray – Grand piano
T.G. Conway – bass keyboards
Ronnie Baker, Michael Foreman – bass
Larry Washington – congas

Charts
Album

Singles

References

External links

1976 albums
The Trammps albums
Albums produced by Norman Harris
Albums recorded at Sigma Sound Studios
Atlantic Records albums